Buddy DeFranco and Oscar Peterson Play George Gershwin is a 1954 album by Buddy DeFranco, accompanied by the Oscar Peterson trio, of songs composed by George Gershwin. Billboard in 1955 wrote: "The flashy talents of clarinetist DeFranco and pianist Peterson jell neatly here in the well-arranged ork setting. [...] The fact that they play Gershwin isn't important, since both men reduce the material at hand into what has become their personal cliches."

Track listing 
 "I Wants to Stay Here" (DuBose Heyward) – 3:46
 "I Was Doing All Right" – 5:21
 "'S Wonderful" – 4:21
 "Bess, You Is My Woman Now" (Heyward) – 4:54
 "Strike Up the Band" – 2:26
 "They Can't Take That Away from Me" – 3:49
 "The Man I Love" – 4:31
 "I Got Rhythm" – 3:18
 "Someone to Watch over Me" – 4:18
 "It Ain't Necessarily So" – 4:10
 "I Wants to Stay Here" – 4:11 Alternate track on CD reissue
 "Someone to Watch over Me" – 4:35 Alternate track on CD reissue

All songs composed by George Gershwin, with lyrics by Ira Gershwin. Additional lyrics by DuBose Heyward where indicated.

Personnel

Performance 
 Buddy DeFranco – clarinet
 Oscar Peterson – piano
 Ray Brown – double bass
 Herb Ellis – guitar
 Bobby White – drums

References 

1954 albums
Buddy DeFranco albums
Oscar Peterson albums
Albums produced by Norman Granz
Clef Records albums